Hisonotus aky, sometimes known as the green hisonotus, is a species of catfish in the family Loricariidae. It is native to South America, where it occurs in Argentina's Uruguay River basin. It reaches 4 cm (1.6 inches) SL. It was formerly considered a member of the genus Epactionotus, although it was transferred to Hisonotus in 2009.

References 

Otothyrinae
Catfish of South America
Fish described in 2004